Dameron is an unincorporated community in St. Mary's County, Maryland, United States. The Point No Point Light Station was listed on the National Register of Historic Places in 2002.  The ZIP Code for Dameron is 20628.

References

Unincorporated communities in St. Mary's County, Maryland
Unincorporated communities in Maryland
Maryland populated places on the Chesapeake Bay